William Blount Rodman (1817, Washington, Beaufort County, North Carolina – 1893) was an American lawyer and politician from North Carolina. He was a justice of the North Carolina Supreme Court from 1868 to 1878.

Life
He was the son of William Wanton Rodman (d. ca. 1825, brother of John Rodman) and Polly Anne (Blount) Rodman.

Rodman graduated from the University of North Carolina at Chapel Hill in 1836 and studied law under Judge William Gaston. He was admitted to the bar in 1838. He delivered an address to the Wake Forest literary societies in 1846. He helped revise the state's legal code in 1854, along with B.F. Moore.

In 1858, he married Camilla Croom, and they had eight children.

He served as a Democratic elector for John C. Breckinridge in 1860 and as a Confederate elector for Jefferson Davis in 1861. During the American Civil War, he commanded Confederate troops and served as a military judge for the Army of Northern Virginia.

After the war he resumed the practice of law in Washington, North Carolina, and, though politically Independent, he supported the Republican Party. He took a leading role at the 1868 state constitutional convention, where he served as chairman of the judiciary committee and unsuccessfully argued that judges should not be elected by the people. Nevertheless, later that same year, Rodman was elected to the Supreme Court.

His grandson, William B. Rodman, III, usually called William B. Rodman, Jr., was also a state Supreme Court justice. The portraits of both justices hang in the Supreme Court chambers.

References

Guide to the William Blount Rodman Papers
Genealogy of the Rodman Family 1620-1886 by Charles Henry Jones (page 93)

1817 births
1893 deaths
North Carolina lawyers
Justices of the North Carolina Supreme Court
1860 United States presidential electors
People from Washington, North Carolina
University of North Carolina at Chapel Hill alumni
North Carolina Democrats
North Carolina Republicans
People of North Carolina in the American Civil War
19th-century American judges
19th-century American lawyers